Cortiglione is a comune (municipality) in the Province of Asti in the Italian region Piedmont, about  southeast of Turin and about  southeast of Asti.

Cortiglione borders the following municipalities: Belveglio, Incisa Scapaccino, Masio, Rocchetta Tanaro, Vaglio Serra, and Vinchio.

References

External links
 Official website

Cities and towns in Piedmont